The Browning wz.1928 is a Polish version of the M1918 BAR. It was a light machine gun used by the Polish During World War II.

History
After Poland regained its independence in 1918, the Polish Army was equipped with all sorts of machine guns inherited from the armed forces of the partitioners, along with equipment from the French and British armies that equipped the Polish Blue Army during the Great War. The large variety of light machine guns used, as well as the fact that each of them used a different caliber, made troop training and logistics a difficult task.

After the Polish-Bolshevik War, in 1923 a competition was opened for a new, standard light machine gun for the Polish army that was to replace all previously used types of LMG. The competition ended without a winner and the following year the Polish Ministry of War purchased 12 specimens of the M1918 Browning Automatic Rifle, Lewis gun ("Lewis wz. 1923") and Hotchkiss M1909 Benét–Mercié each. Testing proved the superiority of the American construction, and during the 1925 competition, a Belgian FN-made Browning was chosen. Although extensive tests were continued, the Polish army ordered a series of Belgian-made BAR machine guns, modified to better suit the Polish needs. The modifications included changing the round from .30-06 Springfield to standard Polish 7.92×57mm Mauser), the construction of a bipod and mounting, and the iron sights (peephole changed to v-notch type). The barrel was lengthened for greater accuracy and a pistol grip was added for easier aiming. Apart from the 10,000 pieces ordered from Fabrique Nationale, Poland also bought a license to producet the weapon domestically. The first wz.28 LMGs were officially commissioned in 1927 and were officially named 7,92 mm rkm Browning wz. 1928, which is Polish for "7.92 mm hand-held machine gun of Browning mark 1928".

Due to serious flaws in license documentation purchased from Belgium, production in Poland was not started until 1930. Until 1939 approximately 14,000 pieces were built. Additional modifications were introduced during the production run. Among them was the replacement of the iron sights with a smaller version and reshaping the butt to a "fish tail" shape. There were also extensive works on spare, replaceable barrels for the weapon, which however were never completed due to the outbreak of World War II.

During the German-Soviet Invasion of Poland of 1939, the rkm wz. 1928 was the standard LMG used by almost all Polish infantry and cavalry units. The German armed forces captured a number of Polish-made Browning guns and used them until the end of World War II under the designation of lMG 28 (p). A number were also seized by the Red Army and used during the war.

Variants
The RKM wz.28 was a basis for development of an aerial, flexible machine gun, designated karabin maszynowy obserwatora wz.37, used mainly by the Polish PZL.37 Łoś bombers.

Users
:Supplied in small quantities by the Soviet Union in 1940
 
: Captured in 1939

: Captured in 1939
: Bought for Spanish Civil War
: Captured from Republican side

Notes

References

7.92×57mm Mauser machine guns
7.92×57mm Mauser battle rifles
Light machine guns
Machine guns of Poland
Weapons and ammunition introduced in 1930
World War II infantry weapons of Poland
World War II machine guns